Eremon is a genus of beetles in the family Cerambycidae, containing the following species:

 Eremon fuscoplagiatum Breuning, 1940
 Eremon mycerinoides Thomson, 1864

References

Cerambycidae genera
Apomecynini